Global Vectra Helicorp Limited (GVHL) is India's largest private helicopter company. It has a fleet of 29 aircraft ranging from small light helicopters to medium-sized twin engined helicopters seating 4 to 15 passengers. The company is promoted by Non-resident Indian businessman Ravi Rishi.

The company's operational headquarters are in Mumbai at the Juhu Aerodrome where it services the oil and gas industry with forward bases at Visakhapatnam and Rajahmundry. The onshore operations, cover the entire Indian subcontinent, and is based in New Delhi and Bangalore. GVHL is listed on the National Stock Exchange and the Bombay Stock Exchange having ISO 9001-2015, 14001–2015, and OHSAS 18001-2007 certifications covering flight operations, engineering, safety, quality control, and commercial systems.

History
The company was founded in 1997 as Azal and started off-shore operations in 1998 with 3 helicopters. The UK based businessman Ravi Rishi of the Vectra Group acquired it in 2004 and the company went public in 2006. A new hangar measuring 6000 square metres was inaugurated in January 2009.  The company's maintenance facility for its Bell fleet housed in this hangar meets international quality standards and has received certification from the DGCA.

Birdie Airport Shuttle Service
Birdie operates twin-engine helicopters seating 9 Passengers from Bangalore International Airport Limited (BIAL), 40 km from the city centre, to helipads at HAL Airport, Whitefield, Electronics City, and Mysore.

Fleet

References

Helicopter airlines
Companies based in Mumbai
Airlines of India
1987 establishments in Maharashtra
Indian companies established in 1987
Airlines established in 1987
Companies listed on the National Stock Exchange of India
Companies listed on the Bombay Stock Exchange